Bernard Cadenat (2 January 1853, in Pexiora – 1 August 1930) was a French politician. He joined at first the French Workers' Party (POF), which in 1902 merged into the Socialist Party of France (PSdF), which in turn merged into the French Section of the Workers' International (SFIO) in 1905. Cadenat was a member of the Chamber of Deputies from 1898 to 1919 and from 1924 to 1930. He was the mayor of Marseille from 1910 to 1912.

References

1853 births
1930 deaths
People from Aude
Politicians from Occitania (administrative region)
French Workers' Party politicians
Socialist Party of France (1902) politicians
French Section of the Workers' International politicians
Members of the 7th Chamber of Deputies of the French Third Republic
Members of the 8th Chamber of Deputies of the French Third Republic
Members of the 9th Chamber of Deputies of the French Third Republic
Members of the 10th Chamber of Deputies of the French Third Republic
Members of the 11th Chamber of Deputies of the French Third Republic
Members of the 13th Chamber of Deputies of the French Third Republic
Members of the 14th Chamber of Deputies of the French Third Republic
Mayors of Marseille